Aleksandra Romaniċ was born 1958 in Zagreb into a family of musicians. She was awarded a scholarship at the age of sixteen to go to the Moscow Tchaikovsky Conservatory. She graduated in 1981 summa cum laude. Completing her master's degree, she was awarded a Fulbright Scholarship to specialize with Gyorgy Sandor at the Juilliard School in New York.

Awards by several piano competitions led to a worldwide career: she has toured with recitals and orchestras throughout France, Russia, Spain, Czechoslovakia, Malta and the USA.
She lives in Munich.

References

Romanić, Aleksandra

1958 births
Bosnia and Herzegovina classical pianists
Bosnia and Herzegovina expatriates in Germany
Living people
Musicians from Zagreb
Women classical pianists
20th-century pianists
21st-century pianists